Göteborg Sim is a Swedish swim team from Gothenburg founded in 1991. The greatest swimmers in the history of Göteborg Sim is Erik Andersson and Josefin Lillhage.

Swimmers
Erik Andersson (2005)
Josefin Lillhage (-1999)

External links
Göteborg Sim's Official Website

Swimming clubs in Sweden
Sports clubs established in 1991
Sports clubs in Gothenburg
1991 establishments in Sweden